Fernando Sáenz Lacalle (16 November 1932 – 28 April 2022) was a Spanish Roman Catholic prelate, 10th Bishop and  sixth Archbishop of San Salvador, El Salvador. He was the successor of Arturo Rivera y Damas. Sáenz held the post once held by Archbishop Óscar Romero, who was assassinated in 1980.

Role as bishop

Liberation theology
In the years following his installation, Sáenz was accused by critics of eviscerating the "preferential option for the poor" of his predecessors, notably Romero, by clamping down on progressive church movements affiliated with Liberation Theology with a series of personnel movements, closing of programs, and changes to seminary curriculum.   Sáenz defended his stances by saying that the Roman Catholic Church must speak on behalf of the poor and defenseless, but never become involved in activism or politics.  Sáenz was a member of the Opus Dei.  He supported the canonization cause of his predecessor, Romero.

Metropolitan cathedral
Sáenz presided over the completion of the Metropolitan Cathedral on 19 March 1999.  Sáenz seemed to find his voice after two deadly earthquakes struck El Salvador a year apart in 2000 and 2001, with the archbishop springing into action to marshal international relief.  In more recent years, Sáenz advocated conservative Catholic views on sex and contraception, called for civil cooperation with police authorities to combat gang violence, and criticized labor strikes in the health sector as an unjustifiable denial of service to hospital patients.

Retirement
In accordance with Canon law, Sáenz tendered his retirement as archbishop on 27 December 2008, and it was accepted. Bishop José Luis Escobar Alas of the Roman Catholic Diocese of San Vicente, El Salvador, was named the eleventh Bishop and seventh Archbishop of San Salvador, El Salvador on Monday, 29 December 2008, by Pope Benedict XVI.

References

External links

Catholic-hierarchy.org entry for Fernando Sáenz Lacalle 

1932 births
2022 deaths
People from Tudela (comarca)
Roman Catholic archbishops of San Salvador
Opus Dei members
University of Zaragoza alumni
Spanish expatriates in El Salvador
Spanish expatriate bishops
20th-century Spanish clergy
Pontifical Lateran University alumni